The following is a list of players,  both past and current, who appeared in at least one game for the Tampa Bay Rays franchise, formerly known as the Devil Rays.

Players in Bold are members of the National Baseball Hall of Fame.

Players in Italics have had their numbers retired by the team.



Alphabetical list

A
{{div col|colwidth=18em}

B

C

D

E

F

G

H

I

J

K

L

M

N

O

P

Q

R

S

T

U

V

W

X

Y

Z

Nationality breakdown

External links
BR batting statistics
BR pitching statistics

Roster
Major League Baseball all-time rosters